George Alexander Mashour is an American anesthesiologist.

Early life and education
Mashour completed his undergraduate degree in philosophy at St. John's College (Annapolis/Santa Fe) and then completed his medical degree and PhD at the Georgetown University School of Medicine. Following his medical degree, Mashour completed his residency in the Department of Anesthesia & Critical Care at the Massachusetts General Hospital and Harvard Medical School. While at Harvard, he also accepted a Fulbright Scholarship to conduct research for his project "Electrophysiology of Analgesic and Anesthetic Action on Serotonin Receptors".

Career
Upon completing his residency at Harvard, Mashour joined the University of Michigan (U-Mich) as a fellow in neuroanesthesiology and joined their faculty as an assistant professor in July 2007. During his tenure at U-Mich, Mashour was appointed the Bert N. La Du Professor and associate chair for research in the Department of Anesthesiology and founded the Center for Consciousness Science. As a result, he was promoted to associate dean for clinical and translational research, and director of the Michigan Institute for Clinical & Health Research. As the associate dean, Mashour and Cynthia Chestek studied the neurological mechanisms at work during ketamine anesthesia. In 2016, Mashour was named the executive director of Translational Research in the U-M Office of Research where he was expected to advocate for translational research across U-Mich.

As a result of his research, Mashour was elected a member of the National Academy of Medicine (NAM) in recognition of his major contributions to the advancement of the medical sciences, health care and public health. Following the election, Mashour was also appointed chair of U-Mich's Department of Anesthesiology and the Robert B. Sweet Professor of Anesthesiology.

During the COVID-19 pandemic, Mashour worked within the University of Michigan's Center for Drug Repurposing to battle the coronavirus. He also collaborated with Theodore Goodson III to research how anesthetic drugs disrupt consciousness in the brain. In 2021, Mashour received the American Society of Anesthesiologists Excellence in Research Award "for his significant work on the neurobiology of consciousness and unconsciousness, as well as his contributions to academic anesthesiology and translational science."

References

External links

Living people
University of Michigan faculty
Georgetown University alumni
St. John's College (Annapolis/Santa Fe) alumni
American anesthesiologists
Members of the National Academy of Medicine
Year of birth missing (living people)